Mario Medrano was an Argentine actor. He starred in the acclaimed Silver Condor-winning 1943 film Juvenilia. Other notable roles include in Ragged Football (1948), ...Y mañana serán hombres (1939) and Back in the Seventies (1945).

Selected filmography
 Our Natacha (1944)
 Back in the Seventies (1945)
 Ragged Football (1948)

References

External links
 

Argentine male film actors
Year of birth missing
Year of death missing